New York in the 1960s is an album by Welsh-born musician John Cale. It was released in August 2004 on American independent label Table of the Elements. It was three-CD box set of Cale's recording from 1960s.

Track listing 
Disc 1
"Sun Blindness Music, for organ" – 31:37
"Summer Heat, for guitar" – 0:29
"The Second Fortress, for vox organ" – 10:38
Disc 2
"Dream Interpretation, for viola & violin" – 20:35
"Ex-Cathedra, for vox organ" – 5:04
"[untitled] for piano" – 12:30
"Carousel, for synthesizer" – 2:34
"A Midnight Rain of Green Wrens at the World's Tallest Building, for viola" – 3:20
"Hot Scoria, for guitar & cimbalom" – 9:20
 Disc 3
"Stainless Steel Gamelan, cembalet & fretless guitar" – 10:24
"At About This Time Mozart Was Dead And Joseph Conrad Was Sailing the Seven Seas Learning English pt. 1, for wollensak, viola & guitar" – 26:29
"Terry's Cha-Cha, for ensemble" – 8:21
"After the Locust, for electric piano & thunder machine" – 4:19
"Big Apple Express, for viola, tape & voice" – 7:45
"Cold Starry Nights, for voice, sarinda & bowed cembalom" – 2:19
"Silent Shadows on Cinemaroc Island, for ensemble" – 8:42

Personnel 
 John Cale – viola, organ, piano, electric piano, guitar, electronics, cembalet
 Sterling Morrison – guitar
 Angus MacLise – cimbalom, tambourine, percussion
 Terry Jennings – soprano saxophone
 Tony Conrad – violin
 Jack Smith – voices
 New York Fire Department – voices

References

John Cale compilation albums
2005 compilation albums